Kamil Sonad (1914, year of death unknown) was a Turkish sculptor.

Sonad was born in Istanbul in 1914, a student of Rudolf Belling. His early work began with classical nudes, aiming to represent the modern woman of the Republic of Turkey. Much of his early work was in plaster. Sonad is deceased.

References

External links
 A number of Sonad's works are on display in the Istanbul Painting and Sculpture Museum.
 Image of his sculpture "Nude"

1914 births
Year of death missing
20th-century Turkish sculptors
Turkish male sculptors